Cakran-Mollaj oil field is a large on-shore Albanian oil field that was discovered in 1978.

See also

Patos Marinza
Oil fields of Albania

References

Oil fields of Albania
Geography of Korçë County
Fier